Devi is a town and union council, an administrative subdivision, of Gujar Khan Tehsil in the Punjab province of  Pakistan.

References

Populated places in Gujar Khan Tehsil
Union councils of Gujar Khan Tehsil
Towns in Gujar Khan Tehsil